Agostino Gatto (July 9, 1883 – May 29, 1952), known as "Gus Steno", and also known as "Steno Gatto", was an American Negro league outfielder in the 1910s.

A native of Italy, Steno played in the Negro leagues for the All Nations club in 1917. He had previously played minor league baseball for the Falls City Colts and the Salina Insurgents. Steno died in Kansas City, Missouri in 1952 at age 68.

References

External links
Baseball statistics and player information from Baseball-Reference Black Baseball Stats and Seamheads

1883 births
1952 deaths
Place of birth missing
All Nations players
20th-century African-American people